Eugene "Gene" Allen (June 17, 1918 – October 7, 2015) was an American art director. He followed his father and became a Los Angeles Police officer after he was laid off from his first job as a sketch artist. After serving in the United States Navy during World War II, Allen went to art school to pursue his career. He won an Oscar in 1965 for Best Art Direction for My Fair Lady, and was nominated for A Star Is Born in 1955 and for Les Girls in 1958. He served as President of the Academy of Motion Pictures Arts and Sciences from 1983 to 1985 and received a Special Achievement Award from the Art Directors Guild in 1997. Allen died on October 7, 2015, at the age of 97.

References

External links

1918 births
2015 deaths
People from Los Angeles
Presidents of the Academy of Motion Picture Arts and Sciences
Los Angeles Police Department officers
American art directors
Best Art Direction Academy Award winners
United States Navy personnel of World War II